The Sinseong-ri Reed Field is a reed bed located at the mouth of the Geum River where the cities Seocheon and Gunsan meet in South Korea.

Geography 
It is 200 meters wide, 1.5 kilometers long and 100,000 pyeong in size. It is one of one of the four largest reed beds in South Korea, along with Gocheon-amho (Haenam), Suncheon Bay (Suncheon) and Ansan reed marsh park (Ansan). It is the seventh typical reed habitat selected by the Korea Tourism Organization. 

The area used to be called 'Gomgae Naru'. To preserve the reed beds, only about 3% of the total area offers walking trails and is accessible for public use. Every winter, from December to January, about 40 different species of winter birds visit, totaling approximately 100,000 birds.

Popular culture 
Reed Field often appears as a location for movies. It was used by Joint Security Area in 2000 and the drama Chu-no in 2010. On the reed beds trail, a log board contains poetry written by poets such as Park Doo-jin, Kim So-wol, Park Mok-wol and Ahn Do-hyun.

Tourism 
The Sinseong-ri Reed Field includes Reed Experience Hall, which sells specialty products in Seocheon such as sokokju and mosi cake. Nearby are tourist attractions such as the Geumgang River estuary resort and the Hansan Mosi (Ramie Fabric) Exhibition Hall.

Reed Field is one of the Eight Scenic Spots of Seocheon along with Maryang-ri Camellia Forest, Geumgang Estuary Bird Sanctuary, Hansan Mosi (Ramie Fabric) Village, Chunjangdae Beach, Munheonseowon Confucian School, Huirisan Recreational Forest, Cheonbangsan Mountain.

Every October the Seocheon Moonlight Culture Reed Festival is held near the Sinseong-ri Reed Field. The festival's programs take place throughout the reeds and local specialty stores and specialty shops.

See also
 Geum River
 Suncheon Bay
 Maryang-ri Camellia Forest

References

External links
 Seocheon County website 
 Seocheon County website 
  Hansan Mosi (Ramie Fabric) Exhibition Hall 
 Doopedia entry 
 Yonhap News Agency article, 20 May 2013 
 Segye Ilbo article, 22 May 2013 

Seocheon County
Wetlands of South Korea